Benjamin Toniutti (born 30 October 1989) is a French professional volleyball player. He is a member of the France national team. The 2020 Olympic Champion, 2015 European Champion, two–time World League winner (2015, 2017), and the 2021 Champions League winner. At the professional club level, he plays for Jastrzębski Węgiel.

Personal life
Toniutti was born and raised in Alsace by his father Maurizio, an Italian French, and French mother Cathy. 
His parents often travel to attend Toniutti's league matches. Toniutti is fluent in Italian. He is married. In August 2015, his wife gave birth to their daughter.

Career
On 13 April 2015, Toniutti signed a contract with Polish club ZAKSA Kędzierzyn-Koźle. On 18 October 2015, the French national volleyball team, including him, achieved a title of the European Champions (3–0 with Slovenia in the final). On 26 April 2016, he won his first title of the Polish Champion. Toniutti was named The Most Valuable Player of the whole season, also during the league, he received an individual MVP award ten times. On 2 May 2016, it was announced that Toniutti extended his contract for the next two seasons (until 2018). On 9 July 2017, France won the World League after beating Brazil in the final. In 2018, ZAKSA extended the contract with Toniutti until 2019.

Honours

Clubs
 CEV Champions League
  2020/2021 – with ZAKSA Kędzierzyn-Koźle

 National championships
 2014/2015  German Cup, with VfB Friedrichshafen
 2014/2015  German Championship, with VfB Friedrichshafen
 2015/2016  Polish Championship, with ZAKSA Kędzierzyn-Koźle
 2016/2017  Polish Cup, with ZAKSA Kędzierzyn-Koźle
 2016/2017  Polish Championship, with ZAKSA Kędzierzyn-Koźle
 2018/2019  Polish Cup, with ZAKSA Kędzierzyn-Koźle
 2018/2019  Polish Championship, with ZAKSA Kędzierzyn-Koźle
 2019/2020  Polish SuperCup, with ZAKSA Kędzierzyn-Koźle
 2020/2021  Polish SuperCup, with ZAKSA Kędzierzyn-Koźle
 2020/2021  Polish Cup, with ZAKSA Kędzierzyn-Koźle
 2021/2022  Polish SuperCup, with Jastrzębski Węgiel
 2022/2023  Polish SuperCup, with Jastrzębski Węgiel

Youth national team
 2006  CEV U20 European Championship
 2007  CEV U19 European Championship
 2008  CEV U20 European Championship

Individual awards
 2007: CEV U19 European Championship – Best Setter
 2013: French Championship – Most Valuable Player
 2013: French Championship – Best Setter
 2015: FIVB World League – Best Setter
 2016: Polish Cup – Best Setter
 2016: Polish Championship – Most Valuable Player
 2017: Polish Cup – Best Setter
 2017: FIVB World League – Best Setter
 2018: FIVB Nations League – Best Setter
 2019: Polish Cup – Best Setter
 2019: CEV European Championship – Best Setter

State awards
 2021:  Knight of the Legion of Honour

References

External links

 
 Player profile at LegaVolley.it 
 Player profile at PlusLiga.pl 
 
 
 Player profile at Volleybox.net

1989 births
Living people
French people of Italian descent
Sportspeople from Mulhouse
French men's volleyball players
Olympic volleyball players of France
Olympic gold medalists for France
Olympic medalists in volleyball
Volleyball players at the 2016 Summer Olympics
Volleyball players at the 2020 Summer Olympics
Medalists at the 2020 Summer Olympics
French expatriate sportspeople in Italy
Expatriate volleyball players in Italy
French expatriate sportspeople in Russia
Expatriate volleyball players in Russia
French expatriate sportspeople in Germany
Expatriate volleyball players in Germany
French expatriate sportspeople in Poland
Expatriate volleyball players in Poland
VC Zenit Kazan players
ZAKSA Kędzierzyn-Koźle players
Jastrzębski Węgiel players
Setters (volleyball)